Maurice "Red" Elder (March 21, 1916 – August 14, 2011) was an American football and baseball coach. He served as the head football coach at  Colorado State University Pueblo (CSU Pueblo) from 1946 to 1951. 

Elder was a fullback at Kansas State University in the mid–1930s, where he played on the conference champion 1934 Kansas State Wildcats football team. He was drafted by the Washington Redskins of the National Football League (NFL) in 1937 but dropped out of training camp and, instead, pursued a career in coaching.

Elder was the maternal grandfather of NFL quarterback Jeff Garcia.

Head coaching record

Football

References

1916 births
2011 deaths
American football fullbacks
Colorado State Rams baseball coaches
CSU Pueblo ThunderWolves football coaches
Kansas State Wildcats football players
People from Wellington, Kansas